Marco Davison Bascur Airport,  is an airport on Isabel Island, an island in the Strait of Magellan,  north-northeast of Punta Arenas, the capital of the Magallanes Region of Chile.

See also

Transport in Chile
List of airports in Chile

References

External links
OpenStreetMap - Marco Davison Bascur
OurAirports - Marco Davison Bascur
SkyVector - Marco Davison Bascur

Airports in Chile
Airports in Magallanes Region